Andrzej Chylinski (born December 5, 1960) is an American racewalker. He competed in the men's 50 kilometres walk at the 1996 Summer Olympics.

References

1960 births
Living people
Athletes (track and field) at the 1995 Pan American Games
Athletes (track and field) at the 1996 Summer Olympics
American male racewalkers
Olympic track and field athletes of the United States
Place of birth missing (living people)
Pan American Games track and field athletes for the United States